Declan Dalton (born 6 November 1997) is an Irish hurler who plays as a forward for club side Fr. O'Neill's, divisional side Imokilly and at inter-county level with the Cork senior hurling team.

Playing career

Fr. O'Neill's

Dalton joined the Fr. O'Neill's club at a young age and played in all grades at juvenile and underage levels. On 16 September 2013, he was at right wing-forward when Fr. O'Neill's defeated Newcestown by 4-14 to 5-10 to win the Cork Premier 2 MHC title.

Dalton subsequently progressed onto the Fr. O'Neill's under-21 team. On 8 December 2018, he gave the "performance of a lifetime" for Fr. O'Neill's when he scored 0-15, including twelve from frees, in 3-24 to 4-18 defeat of Midleton to win the Cork Premier Under-21 Championship title.

Dalton made his first appearance for the Fr. O'Neill's top adult team during the 2014 Cork Intermediate Championship.

On 22 October 2016, Dalton scored six points from full-forward when Fr. O'Neill's drew with Kildorrery in the Cork Intermediate Championship final. The replay a week later also saw Dalton top score for the team with 1-08 in a 1-18 to 1-14 victory.

On 12 October 2019, Dalton lined out at full-forward when Fr. O'Neill's faced Kilworth in the Cork Premier Intermediate Championship final. He ended the game with a winners' medal following the 3-23 to 1-20 victory. Dalton was also the championship's top scorer with 3-45. On 24 November 2019, he scored 1-07 when Fr. O'Neill's defeated Ballysaggart by 2-15 to 0-17 to win the Munster Club Championship.

Imokilly

Dalton's performances at club level lead to him being selected for the Imokilly divisional team during the 2015 Cork Senior Championship.

On 22 October 2017, Dalton was in goal when Imokilly defeated Blackrock by 3-13 to 0-18 to win the Cork Senior Championship final. It was the division's first title since 1998.

Dalton was replaced in goal by Watergrasshill's Dara O'Callaghan for the 2018 Cork Senior Championship, however, he remained on the panel as a forward. On 14 October, he was introduced as a 52nd-minute substitute for Barry Lawton when Imokilly retained the title after a 4-19 to 1-18 defeat of Midleton in the final.

On 20 October 2019, Dalton played in a third successive county final. Lining out at full-forward, he top scored for the team with 1-07 and collected a third successive winners' medal after the 2-17 to 1-16 defeat of Glen Rovers. Dalton was also the championship's top scorer with 3-55.

Cork

Minor and under-21

Dalton first played for Cork at minor level on 8 April 2015 in a 2-20 to 1-13 Munster Championship defeat of Limerick. An anomaly in the championship format saw Cork face the same opposition in the semi-final, with Limerick reversing the result and knocking Dalton's team out of the championship.

On 13 July 2017, Dalton made his first appearance for the Cork under-21 hurling team, scoring 1-12, including a late penalty, in Cork's one-point defeat of Waterford. 

Dalton won a Munster Championship medal on 4 July 2018, after scoring seven points in Cork's 2-23 to 1-13 defeat of Tipperary in the final. A knee injury in the subsequent All-Ireland semi-final defeat of Wexford threatened to end his championship campaign. On 26 August 2018, Dalton scored five points from frees in a 3-13 to 1-16 All-Ireland final defeat by Tipperary in what was his last game in the grade. Dalton was later nominated for the Team of the Year.

Senior

Dalton was added to the extended training panel of the Cork senior team in late 2016. He made his first competitive appearance as goalkeeper on 25 January 2017 and scored two long-range points from frees in Cork's 0-19 to 0-15 Munster League defeat of Clare.

On 27 January 2019, Dalton made his first National Hurling League appearance at centre-forward in a 2-18 to 0-17 defeat by Kilkenny at Nowlan Park. On 13 February, it was announced that he faced a period on the sidelines following a knee operation.

Career statistics

Club

Division

Inter-county

Honours

Fr. O'Neill's
Cork Senior A Hurling Championship: 2022
Munster Intermediate Club Hurling Championship: 2019
Cork Premier Intermediate Hurling Championship: 2019
Cork Intermediate Hurling Championship: 2016
Cork Premier Under-21 A Hurling Championship: 2018
Cork Premier 2 Minor Hurling Championship: 2013

Imokilly
Cork Senior Hurling Championship: 2017, 2018, 2019

Cork
Munster Under-21 Hurling Championship: 2018

References

1997 births
Living people
Fr. O'Neill's hurlers
Imokilly hurlers
Cork inter-county hurlers
Hurling goalkeepers